Smileoceras is an extinct genus of prehistoric nautiloids named by Zhurableva in 1972, included in the Discosorida.

References

External links
 Sepkoski's Online Genus Database (CEPHALOPODA)

Prehistoric nautiloid genera
Discosorida